Fools and Their Money is a lost 1919 silent film comedy directed by Herbert Blaché and starring Emmy Wehlen. Maxwell Karger produced and it was released through Metro Pictures.

Cast

References

External links

1919 films
American silent feature films
Lost American films
Films based on short fiction
Films directed by Herbert Blaché
American black-and-white films
1919 comedy films
Silent American comedy films
1919 lost films
Lost comedy films
1910s American films